Meek is the adjectival form of meekness.

Meek may also refer to:
Meek (surname), a surname (and list of people with the name)
MeeK (musician) (born 1971), Franco-British alternative pop singer-songwriter
Meek (street artist) (born 1978), Australian street artist
Meek, Nebraska, an unincorporated community
Meek Mansion, a historic home near Hayward, California
Meek Channel, a strait in the Argentine Islands, Wilhelm Archipelago
Meek, a character in the comic strip Eek & Meek

See also
The Meek, a fantasy webcomic
Meek Mill or Robert Williams, American hip-hop artist 
Meek's lorikeet (Charmosyna meeki), a parrot
Meek's pygmy parrot (Micropsitta meeki), a parrot
Meek's graphium (Graphium meeki), a butterfly
Meeks (disambiguation)